HNLMS Delfzijl may refer to the following ships of the Royal Netherlands Navy that have been named after Delfzijl:

 , an Alkmaar-class minehunter
 , a Vlissingen-class mine countermeasures vessel

Royal Netherlands Navy ship names